Cooley Kickhams Gaelic Football Club is a Gaelic football and ladies' Gaelic football club based on the Cooley Peninsula, County Louth, Ireland.

History
The club was founded in 1887 and is named after the Cooley Peninsula on which it stands. It bears the Brown Bull of Cooley on the club crest and is also named after the nationalist and writer Charles Kickham (1828–1882).

The club grounds, named Fr. McEvoy Park, are near to Haggardstown, Greenore and Carlingford. They were opened in 1969 by GAA President Séamus Ó Riain.

In 1973 and 1976 they reached the final of the Leinster Senior Club Football Championship.

The ladies' team reached the final of the 2001 Leinster Ladies' Senior Club Football Championship.

Notable players
 Eddie Boyle

 Con Cottrell, also a Cork hurler

 Joseph Ferguson, executed during the Irish Civil War
Neil Gallagher

Rob Kearney, former professional rugby player

Jimmy Magee, commentator and journalist (honorary member)
Gerry (Flogger) Farrell 
Sean O'Neill
Stephen White
Brian White

Football honours
 Louth Senior Football Championship (9): 1935, 1939, 1971, 1973, 1976, 1977, 1978, 1989, 1990
Louth Senior Football League (Cardinal O'Donnell Cup) (15): 1936, 1937, 1966, 1967, 1970, 1972, 1974, 1976, 1979, 1983, 1989, 2004, 2006, 2007, 2008
Senior subsidiary winners (ACC Cup) (4): 1984, 1987, 1998, 2003
Senior subsidiary winners (Old Gaels Cup) (7): 1965, 1967, 1968, 1969, 1971, 1973, 1974
Senior subsidiary winners (Paddy Sheelan Cup) (4): 2004, 2005, 2006, 2014
 Louth Intermediate Football Championship (2): 1907, 2022
 Louth Junior Football Championship (4): 1916, 1934, 1947, 1964
 Louth Under-21 Football Championship (3): 1972, 1982, 2016
 Louth Minor Football Championship (8): 1968, 1971, 1979, 1984, 1998, 2005, 2006, 2020

References

External links
Official website

Gaelic games clubs in County Louth
Gaelic football clubs in County Louth
Carlingford, County Louth